Lawrence Alan Hauben (3 March 1931 – 22 December 1985) was an American actor and screenwriter. Born in New York, he won the Academy Award for Best Adapted Screenplay along with Bo Goldman for One Flew Over the Cuckoo's Nest (1975) at the 48th Academy Awards. He also won a Golden Globe and a Writers Guild of America Award.

He had a small role as a car salesman in Point Blank (1967). In 1971, he released a documentary film, Venus, about his brief relationship with actress Sally Kellerman. 

He died of cancer on 22 December 1985, in Santa Barbara, California.

Awards

References

External links
 

Best Adapted Screenplay Academy Award winners
Best Screenplay Golden Globe winners
Place of birth missing
1931 births
1985 deaths
20th-century American screenwriters